Donald Barry Brown (April 19, 1951 – June 25, 1978) was an American author, playwright and actor who performed on stage and in television dramas and feature films, notably as Frederick Winterbourne in Peter Bogdanovich's Daisy Miller (1974), adapted from the classic Henry James novella (1878). Bogdanovich praised Brown's contribution to the film, describing him as "the only American actor you can believe ever read a book."

Early life
Born Donald Barry Brown in San Jose, California, he was the eldest child of Donald Bernard Brown and Vivian Brown (née Agrillo). His sister was the actress Marilyn Brown, who died by suicide in 1997 at the age of 44. His brother is the novelist James Brown (Final Performance, Hot Wire), who etched an intimate portrait of their dysfunctional family in his acclaimed memoir The Los Angeles Diaries, published by HarperCollins in 2003.

Career
Brown began his acting career as a child of five and took part in many television and live performances. He appeared with Van Johnson in a stage production of The Music Man at the age of ten.

Brown was 19 when he made his first major screen appearance in Halls of Anger (1970), followed by The Great Northfield Minnesota Raid (1972) and his breakthrough role as the American Civil War draft dodger Drew Dixon in Robert Benton's critically acclaimed Bad Company (1972), co-starring with Jeff Bridges. The publicity and promotion for this film was capped by an article in Esquire introducing filmgoers to the "dashing, brooding Brown" in color photographs by Chris von Wangenheim, along with a text mention of Brown's obituary collection focusing on little-known and forgotten Hollywood personalities.

After playing opposite Cybill Shepherd in Daisy Miller, Brown concentrated on television throughout the 1970s, including the TV movie The Disappearance of Aimee (1976), about evangelist Aimee Semple McPherson, and numerous TV episodes. His final features were the crime drama The Ultimate Thrill (1974) and Joe Dante's Piranha (1978).

An authority on actors and film history, Brown was a contributor to Scream Queens: Heroines of the Horrors by Calvin Beck and Bhob Stewart. Published by Macmillan in 1978, the book features illustrated biographical profiles of 29 fantasy film actresses and directors. Brown did a similar survey, the unpublished Unsung Heroes of the Horrors, covering the lives of some lesser known Hollywood talents, and he also contributed to various magazines, including Films in Review and Castle of Frankenstein. The book Who Was Who on Screen Third Edition, by Evelyn Mack Truett was dedicated to Brown, whom she credited with giving data support for the previous edition.

Personal life and death
Brown's marriage to Jennie Vlahos on March 4, 1972 ended in divorce May 1972. On June 27, 1978, Brown ended his life by self-inflicted gunshot at his home in Los Angeles, California. He was cremated, and his ashes were scattered over the Chetco River.

Filmography

References

External links

 
 

1951 births
1978 deaths
American male film actors
American male stage actors
American male television actors
Male actors from San Jose, California
Suicides by firearm in California
20th-century American male actors
20th-century American writers
20th-century American male writers
1978 suicides